Kabulia may refer to:
 Kabulia (grasshopper), a genus of grasshoppers in the family Acrididae
 Kabulia (plant), a genus of plants in the family Caryophyllaceae